Pill Bridge is a stone arch bridge over the River Yeo between the parishes of Ilchester and Long Sutton, in the English county of Somerset. It is a scheduled monument.

The current 17th century packhorse bridge replaced an earlier 13th-century bridge at the same site.

A warehouse at the site was used from 1699 until 1805.

The bridge consists of three semi-circular arches.

References

Scheduled monuments in South Somerset
Bridges in Somerset
Packhorse bridges